Saint Suranus (died ) was an abbot in Umbria, Italy who was martyred by Lombards.
His feast day is 24 January.

Life

Suranus was abbot of a monastery at Sora near Caserta, Italy. 
He was martyred by marauding Lombards around 580 AD when they found his monastery was empty.
The Roman Martyrology under the Twenty-fourth Day of January just notes, "Also, blessed Suranus, abbot, who lived in the time of the Lombards."

Monks of Ramsgate account

The monks of St Augustine's Abbey, Ramsgate wrote in their Book of Saints (1921),

Butler's account

The hagiographer Alban Butler (1710–1773) wrote in his Lives of the Fathers, Martyrs, and Other Principal Saints under January 24,

Notes

Citations

Sources

 

 

Medieval Italian saints
580 deaths